Mario Alberto Tinajero Díaz (born 19 January 1995) is a Mexican footballer who plays as a midfielder for Cafetaleros de Chiapas.

References

1995 births
Living people
Association football midfielders
Chiapas F.C. footballers
Correcaminos UAT footballers
Ocelotes UNACH footballers
Cocodrilos de Tabasco footballers
Cafetaleros de Chiapas footballers
Ascenso MX players
Liga Premier de México players
Tercera División de México players
Footballers from San Luis Potosí
People from San Luis Potosí City
Mexican footballers